Superargo and the Faceless Giants (also known as Superargo, The King of Criminals and Superargo the Giant) is a 1968 Italian-Spanish science fiction-superhero film written and directed by Paolo Bianchini (here credited as "Paul Maxwell"). It is the sequel of Nick Nostro's Superargo Versus Diabolicus.

Plot
In the movie, Superargo battles Faceless Giants. One of his friends wants to kill Superargo.

Cast 
 Ken Wood as  Superargo
  Guy Madison as Prof. Wendland Wond 
   Luisa Baratto 	as Claire Brand  
  Diana Lorys  as Gloria Devon  
  Aldo Sambrell  as Kamir / Pao-Ki  
  Tomás Blanco as Davies  
  Sergio Testori  as Jo Brand
  Valerio Tordi  as Professor Presenski
  Aldo Bufi Landi  as J.G. Stafford 
  Valentino Macchi as Bank Guard

Release
Superargo and the Faceless Giants was submitted to the Italian censorship board in September 1967, but was not released until January 1968 in Italy. The film was released on home video in the United States from several labels including Code Red as a double feature with Wacky Taxi and as part of the Cinema Insomnia collection where it is interspersed with comic commentary by Mr. Lobo in a manner similar to horror host antecedents like Elvira, Mistress of the Dark. Rifftrax released a version with their own humorous commentary in December 2016.

Reception
In a contemporary review, the Monthly Film Bulletin stated that "in the hierarchy of superheroes, Superargo....must rate lower than Jungle Jim." The review found Guy Madison "completely miscast" as "one of the most harmless-looking of villains". The review concluded that the film would "please easily-pleased children, but comic strip aficionados will find even less to arouse them here than in Doc Savage."

See also
 List of Italian films of 1968
 List of Spanish films of 1968

References

Footnotes

Sources

External links

1960s Italian-language films
Italian superhero films
Italian science fiction films
1960s science fiction films
Films directed by Paolo Bianchini
Italian sequel films
Film superheroes
1960s superhero films
Films scored by Berto Pisano
1960s Italian films